Bary Glacier is a glacier flowing west into Jacobsen Bight, South Georgia, south of Christophersen Glacier. The glacier cuts through the longest sedimentary sequence on the island, from Christophersen Glacier to Cape Darnley. It was named by the UK Antarctic Place-Names Committee in 1982 after Thomas de Bary, one of the first directors of the Compañía Argentina de Pesca from 1904.

See also
 List of glaciers in the Antarctic
 Glaciology
 Retreat of glaciers since 1850
 Glacier mass balance

References

 

Glaciers of South Georgia